The Greatest Hits Tour was a concert tour by Elton John. The tour started in February 2011 in Victoria, British Columbia, Canada and has visited the Americas, Europe, Asia and Australasia. The tour placed ninth on Pollstar's "Top 50 Worldwide Tours (Mid-Year)", earning over $40 million with 57 shows.

Background
The first edition of the tour took place in 2011 in Victoria, British Columbia. The tour then moved on through the United States with two of the concerts taking place in Hawaii.

The North American leg of the tour came to a close with five concerts in Canada. Elton played a total of twelve concerts in Canada over the course of the 2011 tour.

The tour moved onto Europe after the United States leg. The tour began in Cardiff, Wales. Due to high demand for tickets a second concert was added. The summer European leg of the tour came to a close in Hertfordshire, England with a performance at Magic Summer Live.

Elton and the band returned to Europe in November for six concerts in mainly taking place in Eastern Europe. This included Elton's first concert in Slovenia, which was originally planned to take place in July 2011 but was rescheduled.

Shortly after the European leg, Elton and the band will briefly performed in Asia. Both of them were his debut performances in those countries. He will in Indonesia and Malaysia for the first time.

Elton and the band then traveled to Australasia. Elton performed his first concert in Dunedin, New Zealand. Also this was the first concert that took place at the venue. Elton and the band will then go on to perform their 15th tour of Australia in November and December 2011.

The tour was extended once again into 2012. The first concert of the 2012 was announced on 28 September 2011 via eltonjohn.com. The concert will take place at B2net Stadium in Chesterfield. More European shows in Germany were announced on 9 November 2011.

It was announced via eltonjohn.com on 26 October 2011: "Elton and the band will return to Honolulu's Blaisdell Arena on Friday, January 6, 2012, at 8pm, performing their Greatest Hits Live concert." A second date at the venue was announced due to high ticket demand.

It was announced on eltonjohn.com on 7 November 2011 that Elton would perform his first ever concert in Peru on 1 February 2012. Elton was supposed to perform a concert at the Sentul International Convention Center in Jakarta, Indonesia on 18 November 2011 but the concert was postponed until Elton's 2012 Asian tour

Opening acts

2Cellos (Europe, North America, Australia) (selected dates)
Tim Bendzko (Germany 2011)
 Ed Drewett (Shrewsburg, Northampton & Hove)
NEeMA (Lucca)
Sofi Hellborg, Sing the Truth (Pori, Finland)

Katie Thomson (Dunedin, New Zealand)
Kara Gordon (Dunedin, New Zealand)
Hokitika (Dunedin, New Zealand)
Eran James (Hunter Valley, Australia & Adelaide, Australia)
Tallia Storm (Falkirk)

Set list
This setlist is representative of the show in Lima. It does not represent all concerts throughout the tour.
"Saturday Night's Alright (For Fighting)" 
"I'm Still Standing" 
"Levon" 
"Madman Across the Water" 
"Holiday Inn" 
"Tiny Dancer" 
"Philadelphia Freedom" 
"Goodbye Yellow Brick Road" 
"Candle in the Wind" 
"Rocket Man" 
"I Guess That's Why They Call It the Blues"
"Hey Ahab"
"Gone to Shiloh"
"Monkey Suit"
"Sacrifice" 
"Honky Cat" 
"Daniel" 
"Sorry Seems to Be the Hardest Word" 
"Don't Let the Sun Go Down on Me" 
"The Bitch Is Back" 
"Are You Ready for Love" 
"Bennie and the Jets"
"Crocodile Rock"

Encore
"Your Song" 
"Nikita"

Tour dates

 *Denotes an Elton John solo concert
Festivals and other miscellaneous performances

Cancellations and rescheduled shows

Box office score data

Tour band
Elton John – piano, vocals
Davey Johnstone – guitar, banjo, backing vocals
Bob Birch – bass guitar, backing vocals
Matt Bissonette – bass guitar, backing vocals (11–21 September 2012)
Kim Bullard – keyboards 
John Mahon – percussion, backing vocals
Nigel Olsson – drums, backing vocals 
Stjepan Hauser – cello 
Luka Sulic – cello
Lisa Stone – backing vocals
Rose Stone – backing vocals
Tata Vega – backing vocals
Jean Witherspoon – backing vocals

External links
 Elton John's official website

References

Elton John concert tours
2011 concert tours
2012 concert tours